Méhkerék is a village in Békés County, in the Southern Great Plain region of south-east Hungary.

History
The village was first mentioned in written sources in 1359. The origin of the village's name may be drawn from the original occupation of its inhabitants (méh means "bee" in Hungarian). The population fled the area after the Ottoman conquest. Romanians settled in the area during the 18th century, with the first Romanian Orthodox church being built in 1770. The first primary school was opened in 1815.

Geography
Most of the residents, being Romanians, speak Romanian as their mother tongue.

Sport
The association football club, Méhkeréki SE, is based in the town.

References

Populated places in Békés County
Romanian communities in Hungary